Terence Cuneo (1907–1996) was an English painter famous for his scenes of railways, horses, ceremonies, and military action.

Ceremonial paintings

Portraits

Military paintings or illustrations

Railway paintings

Automobile paintings

Industrial paintings

Paintings on post-war Dagenham vehicle production

Animal paintings

Mouse cartoons

International paintings

Africa

Italy

Spain

Thailand

American West

Miscellaneous paintings

Illustrations

References

Cuneo